In signal processing, group delay and phase delay are delay times experienced by a signal's various frequency components when the signal passes through a linear time-invariant system (LTI), such as a microphone, coaxial cable, amplifier, loudspeaker, telecommunications system or ethernet cable. These delays are generally frequency dependent, which means that different frequency components experience different delays. As a result, the signal's waveform experiences distortion as it passes through the system. This distortion can cause problems such as poor fidelity in analog video and analog audio, or a high bit-error rate in a digital bit stream. For a modulation signal (passband signal), the information carried by the signal is carried exclusively in the wave envelope.  Group delay therefore operates only with the frequency components derived from the envelope.

Introduction 
The group delay and phase delay properties of a linear time-invariant (LTI) system are functions of frequency, giving the time from when a frequency component of a time varying physical quantity—for example a voltage signal—appears at the LTI system input, to the time when a copy of that same frequency component—perhaps of a different physical phenomenon—appears at the LTI system output.

A varying phase response as a function of frequency, from which group delay and phase delay can be calculated, typically occurs in devices such as microphones, amplifiers, loudspeakers, magnetic recorders, headphones, coaxial cables, and antialiasing filters. All frequency components of a signal are delayed when passed through such devices, or when propagating through space or a medium, such as air or water.

Phase delay 
A linear time-invariant system or device has a phase response property and a phase delay property, where one can be calculated exactly from the other. Phase delay directly measures the device or system time delay of individual frequency components. If the phase delay function at any given frequency—within a frequency range of interest—has the same constant of proportionality between the phase at a selected frequency and the selected frequency itself, the system/device will have the ideal of a flat phase delay property, a.k.a. linear phase. Since phase delay is a function of frequency giving time delay, a departure from the flatness of its function graph can reveal time delay differences among the various signal frequency components, in which case those differences will contribute to signal distortion, which is manifested as the output signal waveform shape being different from that of the input signal. The phase delay property in general does not give useful information if the device input is a modulated signal. For that, group delay must be used.

Group delay 

The group delay is a convenient measure of the linearity of the phase with respect to frequency in a modulation system.

Basic modulation system 
A device's group delay can be exactly calculated from the device's phase response, but not the other way around.

The simplest use case for group delay is illustrated in Figure 1 which shows a conceptual modulation system, which is itself an LTI system with a baseband output that is ideally an accurate copy of the baseband signal input. This system as a whole is referred to here as the outer LTI system/device, which contains an inner (red block) LTI system/device.  As is often the case for a radio system, the inner red LTI system in Fig 1 can represent two LTI systems in cascade, for example an amplifier driving a transmitting antenna at the sending end and the other an antenna and amplifier at the receiving end.

Amplitude Modulation 
Amplitude modulation creates the passband signal by shifting the baseband frequency components to a much higher frequency range.  Although the frequencies are different, the passband signal carries the same information as the baseband signal. The demodulator does the inverse, shifting the passband frequencies back down to the original baseband frequency range. Ideally, the output (baseband) signal is a time delayed version of the input (baseband) signal where the waveform shape of the output is identical to that of the input.

In Figure 1, the outer system phase delay is the meaningful performance metric. For amplitude modulation, the inner red LTI device group delay becomes the outer LTI device phase delay. If the inner red device group delay is completely flat in the frequency range of interest, the outer device will have the ideal of a phase delay that is also completely flat, where the contribution of distortion due to the outer LTI device’s phase response—determined entirely by the inner device’s possibly different phase response—is eliminated. In that case, the group delay of the inner red device and the phase delay of the outer device give the same time delay figure for the signal as a whole, from the baseband input to the baseband output. It is significant to note that it is possible for the inner (red) device to have a very non-flat phase delay (but flat group delay), while the outer device has the ideal of a perfectly flat phase delay.  This is fortunate because in LTI device design, a flat group delay is easier to achieve than a flat phase delay.

Angle Modulation 
In an angle-modulation system—such as with frequency modulation (FM) or phase modulation (PM)—the (FM or PM) passband signal applied to an LTI system input can be analyzed as two separate passband signals, an in-phase (I) amplitude modulation AM passband signal and a quadrature-phase (Q) amplitude modulation AM passband signal, where their sum exactly reconstructs the original angle-modulation (FM or PM) passband signal. While the (FM/PM) passband signal is not amplitude modulation, and therefore has no apparent outer envelope, the I and Q passband signals do indeed have amplitude modulation envelopes.  (However, unlike with regular amplitude modulation, the I and Q envelopes do not resemble the wave shape of the baseband signals, even though 100 percent of the baseband signal is represented in a complex manner by their envelopes.)  So, for each of the I and Q passband signals, a flat group delay ensures that neither the I pass band envelope nor the Q passband envelope will have wave shape distortion, so when the I passband signal and the Q passband signal is added back together, the sum is the original FM/PM passband signal, which will also be unaltered.

Background

Frequency components of a signal 
For a periodic signal, a frequency component is a sinusoid with properties that include time-based frequency and phase.

Generating a basic sinusoid 
The sinusoid, with or without a time based frequency property, is generated by a circle as shown in the figure.  In this example, the sinusoid is a sine wave that is traced out using the  trigonometric function.

When an increasing angle  makes a complete CCW rotation around the circle, one cycle of the function’s pattern is generated. Further increasing the angle beyond 360 degrees simply rotates around the circle again, completing another cycle, where each succeeding cycle repeats the same pattern, making the function periodic. (See "Rotating vector..." animation on the left.) The angle value has no limit, and so the number of times the pattern repeats itself also has no limit. Because of this, a sinusoid has no beginning and no end.

Theory 
In LTI system theory, control theory, and in digital or analog signal processing, the relationship between the input signal,  and the output signal, of an LTI system is governed by a convolution operation:

 

Or, in the frequency domain,

 

where

 

 

and

 .

Suppose that such a system is driven by a quasi-sinusoidal signal, such as a sinusoid having an amplitude envelope  that is slowly changing relative to the frequency  of the sinusoid. Mathematically, this means that the quasi-sinusoidal driving signal has the form

 

and the slowly changing amplitude envelope  means that

 

Then the output of such an LTI system is very well approximated as

 

The phase of the sinusoid, as indicated by the positions of the zero crossings, is delayed in time by an amount equal to the phase delay, . The envelope of the sinusoid is delayed in time by the group delay, .

More generally, it can be shown that for an LTI system with transfer function  driven by a complex sinusoid of unit amplitude,

 

the output is

 

where the phase shift  is

 

Additionally, it can be shown that the group delay, and phase delay, are frequency-dependent. They can be computed from the unwrapped phase shift  by

 

  .

That is, the group delay at each frequency equals the negative of the slope of the phase at
that frequency (compare to instantaneous frequency).

Negative group delay 
Circuits with negative group delay are possible, though causality is not violated. If signals (in a band where group delay is negative) are predictable (such as a Gaussian pulse), negative group delay filters are able to predict the input, providing an illusion of a non-causal time advance. However, if the signal contains an unpredictable event (such as a truncation of the Gaussian pulse), then the illusion breaks down.

Group delay in audio 
Group delay has some importance in the audio field and especially in the sound reproduction field. Many components of an audio reproduction chain, notably loudspeakers and multiway loudspeaker crossover networks, introduce group delay in the audio signal. It is therefore important to know the threshold of audibility of group delay with respect to frequency, especially if the audio chain is supposed to provide high fidelity reproduction. The best thresholds of audibility table has been provided by Blauert and Laws.

Flanagan, Moore and Stone conclude that at 1, 2 and 4 kHz, a group delay of about 1.6 ms is audible with headphones in a non-reverberant condition. Other experimental results suggest that when the group delay in the frequency range from 300 Hz to 1 kHz is below 1.0 ms, it is inaudible.

The waveform of an audio signal can be reproduced exactly by a system that has a flat frequency response over the bandwidth of the signal and a phase delay that is equal to the group delay. Leach introduced the concept of differential time-delay distortion, defined as the difference between the phase delay and the group delay, which is given by:

 .

An ideal system should exhibit zero or negligible differential time-delay distortion.

It is possible to use digital signal processing techniques to correct the group delay distortion that arises due to the use of crossover networks in multi-way loudspeaker systems. This involves considerable computational modeling of loudspeaker systems in order to successfully apply delay equalization, using the Parks-McClellan FIR equiripple filter design algorithm.

Group delay in optics 
Group delay is important in physics, and in particular in optics.

In an optical fiber, group delay is the transit time required for optical power, traveling at a given mode's group velocity, to travel a given distance. For optical fiber dispersion measurement purposes, the quantity of interest is group delay per unit length, which is the reciprocal of the group velocity of a particular mode. The measured group delay of a signal through an optical fiber exhibits a wavelength dependence due to the various dispersion mechanisms present in the fiber.

It is often desirable for the group delay to be constant across all frequencies; otherwise there is temporal smearing of the signal. The degree of nonlinearity of the phase indicates the deviation of the group delay from a constant value.

True time delay
A transmitting apparatus is said to have true time delay (TTD) if the time delay is independent of the frequency of the electrical signal. TTD is an important characteristic of lossless and low-loss, dispersion free, transmission lines. TTD allows for a wide instantaneous signal bandwidth with virtually no signal distortion such as pulse broadening during pulsed operation.

See also 
 Audio system measurements
 Bessel filter
 Eye pattern
 Group velocity — "The group velocity of light in a medium is the inverse of the group delay per unit length."

References

External links 
 Discussion of Group Delay in Loudspeakers
 Group Delay Explanations and Applications
 "Introduction to Digital Filters with Audio Applications", Julius O. Smith III, (September 2007 Edition).

Optics
Waves
Signal processing
Electrical engineering